Ladinin-1 is a protein that in humans is encoded by the LAD1 gene.

The protein encoded by this gene may be an anchoring filament that is a component of basement membranes. It may contribute to the stability of the association of the epithelial layers with the underlying mesenchyme.

References

Further reading

Extracellular matrix proteins